Kangnam University is a private university in Yongin, South Korea.

Founded July 1, 1946 by Reverend Yi Ho-bin as the Choong-ang Theology Institute, the school initially met at a lecture hall in the local YMCA in Seoul, South Korea. The university holds the spirit of Gyeongcheonanein, which means 'to worship the heavens and love mankind'. The institution eventually moved in 1967 to Jangsa-dong in Seoul and then to the Daechi-dong, Gangnam-gu in 1974.

In 1976, the school was renamed the Kangnam Social Welfare School; the name, which the university kept to this day, comes from its city ward at the time. In 1980, the school moved to its present location in Yongin, Gyeonggi-do, South Korea. Kangnam received its university accreditation in 1992.

EverLine has a station nearby.

Colleges
Liberal Arts College
College of International Studies
College of Business Administration

See also
List of colleges and universities in South Korea
Education in South Korea

External links 
  

Universities and colleges in Gyeonggi Province
Yongin
1946 establishments in Korea
Educational institutions established in 1946